Centaurea demirizii, or  Demiriz's centaury, is a herbaceous plant, a member of the family Asteraceae.

Distribution 
It is an endemic species to Turkey.

Taxonomy 
It was named by Gerhard Wagenitz, in 1960.

References

External links 

 Holotype of Centaurea demirizii Wagenitz - family COMPOSITAE
 Karyological studies of four endemic Centaurea L. species, 2015
 https://www.gbif.org/species/169340637/verbatim

demirizii